The 2017 Copa Venezuela was the 48th edition of the competition. It began with the first round on 26 April and finished with the second leg of the final on 29 November 2017. The winner qualified to the 2018 Copa Sudamericana.

Primera División side Zulia were the defending champions, but they were eliminated by Ureña in the quarter-finals.

Mineros won the title after defeating Zamora in the final, 5–4 on aggregate.

First stage

 Teams entering this round: 21 teams from the Tercera División.
 The matches take place on 26 April, 3 and 10 May 2017.

Group 1

Group 2

Group 3

Group 4

Group 5

Group 6

Group 7

Second stage

 Teams entering this round: 21 teams from the Segunda División.
 The first legs will be played on 24 and the second legs will be played on 28 May 2017.

|}

First leg

Second leg

Third stage

 Teams entering this round: 18 teams from the Primera División.

|}

First leg

Second leg

Final stages

Round of 16

|}

First leg

Second leg

Quarter-finals

|}

First leg

Second leg

Semi-finals

|}

First leg

Second leg

Final

Mineros won 5–4 on aggregate.

References

External links
Official website of the Venezuelan Football Federation 
Copa Venezuela 2017, Soccerway.com

Copa Venezuela
Venezuela
2017 in Venezuelan football